Barnes Glacier is a glacier on the west side of Hemimont Plateau flowing west into Blind Bay on the west coast of Graham Land. It was named by the UK Antarctic Place-Names Committee in 1958 for Howard T. Barnes, Canadian physicist and pioneer of ice engineering.

See also
 List of glaciers in the Antarctic
 Glaciology

References
 

Glaciers of Loubet Coast